SB-215505 is a drug which acts as a potent and selective antagonist at the serotonin 5-HT2B receptor, with good selectivity over the related 5-HT2A and 5-HT2C receptors. It is used in scientific research into the function of the 5-HT2 family of receptors, especially to study the role of 5-HT2B receptors in the heart, and to distinguish 5-HT2B-mediated responses from those produced by 5-HT2A or 5-HT2C.

References

5-HT2B antagonists
Chloroarenes
Indolines
Ureas
Quinolines